Taiwan Canasta is a 1985 Yugoslav comedy-drama film directed by Goran Marković.

Cast 
 Boris Komnenić - Sasa Belopoljanski
 Neda Arnerić - Narcisa Vidmar
 Radko Polič - Dusan Vidmar
 Gordana Gadžić - Ivanka
 Miki Manojlović - Rade Seljak 
 Petar Božović - Pedja
 Bora Todorović - Jogi
 Semka Sokolović-Bertok - Direktorka muzeja
 Bogdan Diklić - Drazenko

Release and reception 
The film was shown at the 1985 Pula Film Festival, where Gordana Gadžić received the Golden Arena for Best Supporting Actress.

References

External links 

1985 comedy-drama films
1985 films
Yugoslav comedy-drama films
Films set in Yugoslavia
Films set in Serbia
Films set in Belgrade
Films shot in Belgrade